Myrmecocystus yuma is a species of ant native to the southwestern United States and a small part of Northern Mexico. This species, like most in the genus of Myrmecocystus, create worker repletes.

References 

Formicinae
Insects described in 1912